Robert Tijdeman (born 30 July 1943 in Oostzaan, North Holland) is a Dutch mathematician. Specializing in number theory, he is best known for his Tijdeman's theorem. He is a professor of mathematics at the Leiden University since 1975, and was chairman of the department of mathematics and computer science at Leiden from 1991 to 1993. He was also president of the Dutch Mathematical Society from 1984 to 1986.

Tijdeman received his PhD in 1969 from the University of Amsterdam, and received an honorary doctorate from Kossuth Lajos University in 1999. In 1987 he was elected to the Royal Netherlands Academy of Arts and Sciences.

References

External links
 Tijdeman's web site at Leiden.

1943 births
Living people
People from Oostzaan
20th-century Dutch mathematicians
21st-century Dutch mathematicians
Number theorists
Members of the Royal Netherlands Academy of Arts and Sciences
Academic staff of Leiden University
University of Amsterdam alumni